The Kuantan District is a district in Pahang, Malaysia. Located in the north-east of Pahang, the district bordered Kemaman District
of Terengganu on the north, South China Sea on the east, Jerantut District and Maran District on the west and Pekan District on the south.

The major towns in the district are Kuantan and Bandar Indera Mahkota. Panching, Sungai Lembing, Gambang and Beserah also located here.

Administrative divisions

Kuantan District is divided into 6 mukims, which are:
 Beserah
 Kuala Kuantan (downtown Kuantan)
 Penor
 Sungai Karang
 Ulu Kuantan
 Ulu Lepar

Additionally, the Gebeng industrial area is an autonomous sub-district (daerah kecil) within Kuantan district since 2020.

Demographics

The following is based on Department of Statistics Malaysia 2010 census.

Education

Higher Education
IPTA are institutes of higher learning run by the government. In Kuantan, they include:
International Islamic University Malaysia (IIUM) 
University Malaysia Pahang 
Kolej Universiti Islam Pahang Sultan Haji Ahmad Shah (KUIPSAS)
Politeknik Sultan Haji Ahmad Shah
Kolej Komuniti Kuantan
Kolej Matrikulasi Pahang (KMPh)

IPTS are institutes of higher learning run by private entities. In Kuantan, they include: 
Open University Malaysia (OUM)
Widad University College
Kolej Yayasan Pahang
Kolej Poly-Tech MARA
Kolej Matrikulasi Pahang (KMPh)
Olympia College
Institut ECMA
Institut Latihan Perindustrian Kuantan (ILP Kuantan)
Institut Teknologi MIDAS
Institut Saga
Kolej Kemahiran Tinggi MARA (KKTM)
Kolej Komuniti Paya Besar, Gambang
Kolej Professional Mara Indera Mahkota
Kolej PSDC
Kolej Teknologi Cosmopoint
Malaysian Aviation Training Academy (MATA Aviation)
DRB-HICOM of Automotive Malaysia (DRB-HICOM U)

Federal Parliament and State Assembly Seats 

List of Kuantan district representatives in the Federal Parliament (Dewan Rakyat)

List of district representatives in the State Legislative Assembly (Dewan Undangan Negeri)

See also
 Districts of Malaysia

References

External links 

Official website of Kuantan Municipal Council
 Rancangan Tempatan Daerah Kuantan 2035